The Meratus white-eye (Zosterops meratusensis) is a species of white-eye from the Meratus Mountains of Borneo, Indonesia.

References

Zosterops
Endemic birds of Borneo
Birds described in 2021